Asxanakəran (also, Askhanakeran) is a village and municipality in the Astara Rayon of Azerbaijan.  It has a population of 1,066.  The municipality consists of the villages of Asxanakəran, Azaru, Balbau, Bursut, and Dəstor.

References

External links

Populated places in Astara District